FWB may refer to:
Locations
 Branson West Airport, in Missouri, United States
 Fort Walton Beach, Florida, a city in the United States
 Wiesbaden-Biebrich station, in Germany

Organizations
 Feinwerkbau, a German firearm manufacturer
 Filmmakers Without Borders, an American charity
 Frankfurt Stock Exchange
 Free Will Baptist, a Christian denomination
 French Community of Belgium (French: , "Wallonia-Brussels Federation")

Other
 "Friends with benefits", friends who carry on a casual sexual relationship